Ford v. Wainwright, 477 U.S. 399 (1986), was a landmark U.S. Supreme Court case that upheld the common law rule that the insane cannot be executed; therefore the petitioner is entitled to a competency evaluation and to an evidentiary hearing in court on the question of their competency to be executed.

Background
Alvin Bernard Ford was convicted of murder in 1974 and sentenced to death in Florida. In 1982, while on death row, Ford's mental health diminished to a point resembling paranoid schizophrenia. Ford began referring to himself as Pope John Paul III and reported such accomplishments as thwarting a vast Ku Klux Klan conspiracy to bury dead prisoners inside the prison walls, foiling an attempt by prison guards to torture his female relatives inside the prison, and personally appointing nine new justices to the Florida Supreme Court. Ford also claimed he was "free to go whenever [he] wanted" because he theorized that anyone who executed him would, in turn, be executed.

A panel of three psychiatrists was eventually called to examine Ford's behavior, and it concluded that while Ford had psychosis and various mental disorders, he was still capable of understanding the nature of the death penalty and the effect that such a penalty would have on him. Florida Governor Bob Graham acted without further comment on the panel's findings but in accord with a Florida statute in signing a death warrant for Ford in 1984. Ford sued the secretary of the Florida Department of Corrections, Louie L. Wainwright.

Opinion
The Court, in an opinion by Justice Marshall, reviewed the evolving standards of the Eighth Amendment to be those consistent with "the progress of a maturing society", and one not tolerable of acts traditionally branded as "savage and inhumane", as the execution of the mentally insane was considered in early English and American common law  reasoned that executing the insane did not serve any penological goals and that Florida's procedures for determining competency were inadequate. Thus, the Court made a preliminary finding that the Eighth Amendment bars states from inflicting capital punishment upon insane persons.

The Court then further addressed the procedural issues present in making a determination of insanity for Eighth Amendment concerns.  The court found that such a determination could not be left solely to the executive branch, as was done via the Florida Statute allowing then Governor Graham to sign Ford's death warrant solely on recommendation by an appointed committee of psychiatrists.  Rather, the Court held, that a proper judicial hearing, in which full procedural rights would be afforded, including the right to counsel and to cross-examine witnesses, was necessary for such a finding.

In their dissents, Justices O'Connor and White claimed that execution of the insane was not per se unconstitutional.  The Justices further commented, however, that states had a right to create certain protected liberties in state statutes, of which a prohibition on the execution of the insane was a liberty which could be validly created.  Once validly created by a state, that liberty interested required the minimum due process protections afforded to other constitutionally protected liberties, in which sole action by the executive branch, as in this case, would still fail to provide.

Justice Rehnquist, in dissent, stated a belief that in common-law tradition, it was actually the executive branch who was sole  arbiter of decisions involving the sanity of prisoners sentenced to death.  In this respect, Justice Rehnquist felt that the majority had formed its opinion at the "expense of 'our common law heritage'".

The inmate was transferred to Florida State Hospital for treatment after he was reevaluated and found to be  incompetent to be executed.

In 1989, a federal district judge ruled that Ford was sane, but defense lawyers appealed that ruling.

The appeal was pending when Ford died of a respiratory illness on February 6, 1991, at 37.

See also
 Panetti v. Quarterman (2007)
 Penry v. Lynaugh (1989)
 List of criminal competencies 
 List of United States Supreme Court cases, volume 477
 List of United States Supreme Court cases
 Lists of United States Supreme Court cases by volume
 List of United States Supreme Court cases by the Rehnquist Court

References

External links
 

United States Supreme Court cases
Cruel and Unusual Punishment Clause and death penalty case law
1986 in United States case law
Capital punishment in Florida
United States Supreme Court cases of the Burger Court